Calls is a 2021 American web television miniseries created by Fede Álvarez. The show is based on a French television series of the same name created by Timothée Hochet. The American series is a co-production between Apple TV+ and French network Canal+, the latter being the production company behind the original French version. It premiered on March 19, 2021, on Apple TV+.

Premise
Told through a series of interconnected phone conversations, these conversations chronicle the mysterious story of a group of strangers whose lives are thrown into disarray in the lead-up to an apocalyptic event.

Calls allows "audiences to experience short stories through real-life audio sources and minimal visuals."

Cast 

 Aaron Taylor-Johnson: Mark
 Aubrey Plaza: Dr. Rachel Wheating
 Ben Schwartz: Andy
 Clancy Brown: General Wilson
 Danny Huston: Frank
 Danny Pudi: Dr. Burman
 Edi Patterson: Darlene
 Gilbert Owuor: Craig
 Jaeden Martell: Justin
 Jenica Bergere: Mom
 Jennifer Tilly: Mother
 Joey King: Skylar
 Johnny Sneed: Perry
 Judy Greer: Alexis
 Karen Gillan: Sara
 Laura Harrier: Layla
 Lily Collins: Camila
 Mark Duplass: Patrick
 Nick Jonas: Sam
 Nicholas Braun: Tim
 Paola Nuñez: Ana
 Paul Walter Hauser: Floyd
 Pedro Pascal: Pedro
 Riley Keough: Rose
 Rosario Dawson: Katherine
 Stephen Lang: Dr. Wheating

Episodes

Production
On June 21, 2018, it was reported that Apple had given the production a series order for a first season consisting of ten episodes. The series, an English-language adaptation of original French series Calls, was created by original series creator Timothée Hochet. The show is a co-production between Apple TV+ and French network Canal+. Alongside Apple's series order announcement, it was confirmed that Apple had acquired the rights to the existing season of the original French series.

Reception 
The review aggregation website Rotten Tomatoes reports that 95% of 20 reviews are positive for the series, with an average rating of 8.4/10. The critics consensus states, "Recalling the immersive serials of radio's heyday, Calls weaves a spooky mystery with terrific vocal performances and unsettling ambience — letting the visual storytelling play out in viewers' horrified imaginations."

References

External links
  – official site

2020s American drama television series
American television series based on French television series
Apple TV+ original programming
Canal+ original programming
English-language television shows
2021 American television series debuts
2021 American television series endings
Works by Fede Álvarez
Works by Rodo Sayagues